Sound of the Street is DMX Krew's debut album, released on Rephlex Records in 1996.

Track listing
 "Sound of the Street"
 "Rock to the Beat"
 "Dance to the Beat"
 "Funky Feelin'"
 "Sound of the DMX"
 "Move My Body"
 "Inside Your Mind"
 "Emerging Technology"
 "Rock Your Body 2"
 "Anybody Out There?"

References

1996 debut albums
DMX Krew albums
Rephlex Records albums